Maja Angelovska (born 12 February 1994) is a Macedonian footballer who plays as a defender for Slovenian club Krim and the North Macedonia women's national team.

References

1994 births
Living people
Women's association football defenders
Macedonian women's footballers
North Macedonia women's international footballers
Macedonian expatriate footballers
Macedonian expatriate sportspeople in Slovenia
Expatriate women's footballers in Slovenia
ŽNK Olimpija Ljubljana players